BS2 may refer to:

 NHK BS 2, a former TV channel
 BS2, a BS postcode area for Bristol, England
 BS2, a center drill bit size
 BS/2, the original German name of the OS/2 operating system
 BASIC Stamp 2, a microcontroller
 Brave Saint Saturn, an American Christian rock band 
 Brigade Spéciale N°2, a group related to Geheime Feldpolizei, the German secret military police during World War II
Brilliance BS2, a car
BS 2, Specification and Sections of Tramway Rails and Fishplates, a British Standard
 BS-II Bharat Stage emission standards in India
 , a Brazilian bank

See also
BS-2A and BS-2B, a Yuri (satellite)